Virginia Elizabeth "Geena" Davis (born January 21, 1956) is an American actor and producer. She is the recipient of various accolades, including an Academy Award and a Golden Globe Award.

After studying drama at Boston University, Davis made her acting debut in the film Tootsie (1982) and eventually starred in the thriller The Fly (1986), which proved to be one of her first box office hits. While the fantasy comedy Beetlejuice (1988) brought her to prominence, the drama The Accidental Tourist (1988) earned her the Academy Award for Best Supporting Actress. She established herself as a leading lady with the road film Thelma & Louise (1991), for which she received a nomination for the Academy Award for Best Actress, and the sports film  A League of Their Own (1992), garnering a Golden Globe Award nomination. However, Davis's roles in the box office failures Cutthroat Island (1995) and The Long Kiss Goodnight (1996), both directed by then-husband Renny Harlin, were followed by a lengthy break and downturn in her career.

Davis starred as the adoptive mother of the titular character in the Stuart Little franchise (1999–2005) and as the first female president of the United States in the television series Commander in Chief (2005–2006), winning the Golden Globe Award for Best Actress – Television Series Drama for her role in the latter. Her later films include Accidents Happen (2009) and Marjorie Prime (2017). She has portrayed the recurring role of Dr. Nicole Herman in Grey's Anatomy (2014–2015, 2018) and that of Regan MacNeil–Angela Rance in the first season of the horror television series The Exorcist (2017).

In 2004, Davis launched the Geena Davis Institute on Gender in Media, which works collaboratively with the entertainment industry to dramatically increase the presence of female characters in media. Through the organization, she launched the annual Bentonville Film Festival in 2015, and executive produced the documentary This Changes Everything in 2018. Thanks to the organization, she was awarded with the Jean Hersholt Humanitarian Award bestowed by the Academy Awards in 2019 and with the Governors Award given by the Primetime Emmy Awards in 2022.

Early life
Davis was born on January 21, 1956, in Wareham, Massachusetts. Her mother, Lucille, was a teacher's assistant, and her father, William F. Davis, was a civil engineer and church deacon. Both were from small towns in Vermont. Davis has an older brother, Danforth ("Dan").

She became interested in music at an early age. She learned piano and flute and played organ well enough as a teenager to be organist at her Congregational church in Wareham. Davis was also a cheerleader and was cheer captain her senior year of high school. She attended Wareham High School and was an exchange student in Sandviken, Sweden, where she became fluent in Swedish. She wanted to study acting at Boston University but missed the required audition during her year in Sweden, so she began her college education at New England College before transferring to Boston University; she didn't earn enough credits to graduate, having received a grade of "incomplete" in at least one class and an F in "movement" class. Her first post-university work was as a model for window mannequins at Ann Taylor; she then signed with New York's Zoli modeling agency.

In her 2022 memoir, she states that her brother came up with the nickname Geena shortly after her birth to differentiate her from her Aunt Virginia, who went by the nickname Ginny. Her mother chose the spelling so that people wouldn't think the name was pronounced as in "vagina."

Career

Rise to fame (1982–1987)
Davis was working as a model when she was cast by director Sydney Pollack in his film Tootsie (1982) as a soap opera actor, whom she has described as "someone who's going to be in their underwear a lot of time". It was the second most profitable film of 1982, received ten Academy Awards nominations and is considered a cult classic. She next won the regular part of Wendy Killian in the television series Buffalo Bill, which aired from June 1983 to March 1984; and had a writing credit in one episode. Despite the series' eleven Emmy Awards nominations, lukewarm ratings led to its cancellation after two seasons. Davis concurrently guest-starred in Knight Rider, Riptide, Family Ties and Remington Steele, and followed with a series of her own, Sara, which lasted 13 episodes. 
During this period, she also auditioned for the 1984 science fiction/action film The Terminator, reading for the lead role of Sarah Connor, which eventually went to Linda Hamilton. In Fletch (1985), an action comedy, she appeared with Chevy Chase as the colleague of a Los Angeles Times undercover reporter trying to expose drug trafficking on the beaches of Los Angeles. She also starred in the horror comedy Transylvania 6-5000 as a nymphomaniac vampire alongside future husband Jeff Goldblum. They also starred in the sci-fi thriller The Fly (1986), loosely based on George Langelaan's 1957 short story of the same name, where Davis portrayed a science journalist and an eccentric scientist's love interest. It was a commercial success and helped establish her as an actor. In 1987 she appeared with Goldblum again in the offbeat comedy Earth Girls Are Easy.

Recognition and critical acclaim (1988–1992)

Director Tim Burton cast Davis in his film Beetlejuice (1988) as one of a recently deceased young couple who become ghosts haunting their former house; it also starred Alec Baldwin, Michael Keaton and Winona Ryder. It made $73.7 million from a budget of $15 million, and Davis's performance and the overall film received mostly positive reviews.

Davis took on the role of an animal hospital employee and dog trainer with a sickly son in the drama The Accidental Tourist (1988), opposite William Hurt and Kathleen Turner. Critic Roger Ebert, who gave the film four stars out of four, wrote: "Davis, as Muriel, brings an unforced wackiness to her role in scenes like the one where she belts out a song while she's doing the dishes. But she is not as simple as she sometimes seems [...]". The film was a critical and commercial success, and she received an Oscar as Best Supporting Actress for her appearance in it.

Davis appeared as the girlfriend of a man who, dressed as a clown, robs a bank in midtown Manhattan, in the comedy Quick Change (1990). Based on a book of the same name by Jay Cronley, it is a remake of the 1985 French film Hold-Up starring Jean-Paul Belmondo. Despite modest box office returns, the Chicago Tribune found the lead actors "funny and creative while keeping their characters life-size". Davis next starred with Susan Sarandon in Ridley Scott's road film Thelma & Louise (1991), as friends who embark on a road trip with unforeseen consequences. A critical and commercial success, it is considered a classic, as it influenced other films and artistic works and became a landmark feminist film. Davis received an Academy Award nomination for Best Actress for her role. It also featured Brad Pitt in his breakout role as a drifter; in his 2020 acceptance speech for Best Supporting Actor, Pitt thanked director Ridley Scott and Geena Davis for "giving me my first shot."

In 1992, Davis starred alongside Madonna and Tom Hanks in A League of Their Own as a baseball player on an all-women's team. It reached number one at the box office, became the tenth highest-grossing film of the year in North America, and brought Davis a Best Actress Golden Globe Award nomination. She played a television reporter in the comedy Hero (also 1992) alongside Dustin Hoffman and Andy Garcia. Although it flopped at the box office, Roger Ebert felt Davis was "bright and convincing as the reporter (her best line, after surviving the plane crash, is shouted through an ambulance door: "This is my story! I did the research!")".

Downturn, hiatus and television roles (1993–2009)
In 1994's Angie, Davis played an office worker who lives in the Bensonhurst section of Brooklyn and dreams of a better life. The film received mixed reviews from critics, despite much praise for Davis, and was a commercial failure. In her other 1994 release, Speechless, Davis reunited with Michael Keaton to play insomniac writers who fall in love until they realize that both are writing speeches for rival candidates in a New Mexico election. Despite negative reviews and modest box office returns, she was nominated for a Golden Globe Award for Best Actress – Musical or Comedy for her performance.
Davis teamed up with her then-husband, director Renny Harlin, for the films Cutthroat Island (1995) and The Long Kiss Goodnight (1996), with Harlin hoping that they would turn her into an action star. While The Long Kiss Goodnight managed to become a moderate success, Cutthroat Island flopped critically and commercially and was once listed as having the "largest box office loss" by Guinness World Records. The film is credited to be a contributing factor in the demise of Davis as a bankable star. She divorced Harlin in 1998 and took an "unusually long" two years off to reflect on her career, according to The New York Times. She appeared as Eleanor Little in the well-received family comedy Stuart Little (1999), a role she reprised in Stuart Little 2 (2002) and again in Stuart Little 3: Call of the Wild (2005).

By the mid and late 1990s, Davis's film career had become less noteworthy and critical acclaim had waned. In a 2016 interview with Vulture, she recalled: "Film roles really did start to dry up when I got into my 40s. If you look at IMDb, up until that age, I made roughly one film a year. In my entire 40s, I made one movie, Stuart Little. I was getting offers, but for nothing meaty or interesting like in my 30s. I'd been completely ruined and spoiled. I mean, I got to play a pirate captain! I got to do every type of role, even if the movie failed."

Davis starred in the sitcom The Geena Davis Show, which aired for one season on ABC during the 2000–01 U.S. television season. She went on to star in the ABC television series Commander in Chief, portraying the first female president of the United States. While this role garnered her a Golden Globe for Best Actress in a Drama Series in 2006, the series was cancelled after its first season; Davis admitted she was "devastated" by its cancellation in a 2016 interview. "I still haven't gotten over it. I really wanted it to work. It was on Tuesday nights opposite House, which wasn't ideal. But we were the best new show that fall. Then, in January, we were opposite American Idol. They said, 'The ratings are going to suffer, so we should take you off the air for the entire run of Idol, and bring it back in May. I put a lot of time and effort into getting it on another network, too, but it didn't work". She was also nominated for an Emmy Award and a SAG Award for Outstanding Female Actor in a Drama Series. She was awarded the 2006 Women in Film Lucy Award.

Davis was the only American actor to be cast in the Australian-produced film Accidents Happen (2009), portraying a foul-mouthed and strict mother. She stated that it was the most fun she had ever had on a film set, and felt a deep friendship and connection to both of the actors who played her sons. Written by Brian Carbee and based on his own childhood and adolescence, the film received a limited theatrical release and mixed reviews from critics. Variety found it to be "led by a valiant Geena Davis", despite a "script that mistakes abuse for wit".

Professional expansion (2010present)
Following a long period of intermittent work, Davis often ventured into television acting, and through her organization, the Geena Davis Institute on Gender in Media, saw her career expand during the 2010s. In 2012, she starred as a psychiatrist in the miniseries Coma, based on the 1977 novel Coma by Robin Cook and the subsequent 1978 film. She played a powerful female movie executive in the critically acclaimed comedy In a World... (2013), the directorial debut of Lake Bell. Bell found her only dialogue to be her favorite in the film and called it her "soapbox moment".

In 2014, Davis provided her voice for the English version of the Studio Ghibli animated film When Marnie Was There, as she was drawn to the film's abundant stories and strong use of female characters. She played the recurring role of Dr. Nicole Herman, an attending fetal surgeon with a life-threatening brain tumor, during the 11th season of Grey's Anatomy (2014–15). In 2015, Davis launched an annual film festival to be held in Bentonville, Arkansas, to highlight diversity in film, accepting films that prominently feature minorities and women in the cast and crew. The first Bentonville Film Festival took place from May 5–9, 2015. Davis appeared as the mother of a semi-famous television star in the comedy Me Him Her (2016).

In the television series The Exorcist (2016), based on the 1973 film of the same name, Davis took on the role of grown-up Regan MacNeil, who has renamed herself Angela Rance to find peace and anonymity from her ordeal as a child. The Exorcist was a success with critics and audiences. In 2017, Davis starred in the film adaptation Marjorie Prime, alongside Jon Hamm, playing the daughter of an 85-year old experiencing the first symptoms of Alzheimer's disease, and appeared as the imaginary god of a heavyset 13-year-old girl in the comedy Don't Talk to Irene. Vanity Fair wrote that she stole "every scene" in Marjorie Prime, while Variety, on her role in Don't Talk to Irene, remarked: "There's no arguing the preternatural coolness of Geena Davis—a fact celebrated in self-conscious fashion by Don't Talk to Irene, a familiar type of coming-of-age film whose most distinguishing feature is the presence of the actress".

In 2018, Davis returned to Grey's Anatomy, reprising the role of Dr. Nicole Herman in the show's 14th season, and executive produced the documentary This Changes Everything, in which she was also interviewed about her experiences in the industry. The film premiered at the Toronto International Film Festival, where it was named first runner-up for the People's Choice Award: Documentaries. In 2019, she joined the voice cast of She-Ra and the Princesses of Power as Huntara. Also in Netflix in 2019, she joined the cast of GLOW as Sandy Devereaux St. Clair, a former showgirl turned entertainment director of the Fan-Tan Hotel and Casino. In 2022, Davis' likeness was used for the character of Poison Ivy in the DC Entertainment comic book series Batman '89, set between the events of Batman Returns (1992) and The Flash (2023).

In October 2022, HarperOne published Davis's Dying of Politeness: A Memoir of her journey from childhood conventional New England femininity and trauma to feminist "badassery", one role at a time, on screen and in the real world.

Personal life

Marriages and family

Davis began dating restaurateur Richard Emmolo in December 1977 and moved in with him a month later. The two married on March 25, 1981, but separated in February 1983 and divorced on June 27, 1984. She then dated future Thelma and Louise co-star Christopher McDonald, to whom she was briefly engaged. 

In 1985, she met her second husband, actor Jeff Goldblum, on the set of Transylvania 6-5000. The couple married on November 1, 1987, and appeared together in two more films: The Fly and Earth Girls Are Easy. Davis filed for divorce in October 1990, and it was finalized the following year. In 2022, Davis told People that her relationship with him "was a magical chapter in my life."

Bodyguard Gavin de Becker was Davis' boyfriend during the early 1990s. After a five-month courtship, she married filmmaker Renny Harlin on September 18, 1993. He directed her in Cutthroat Island and The Long Kiss Goodnight. Davis filed for divorce on August 26, 1997, a day after her personal assistant Tiffany Browne gave birth to a child fathered by Harlin. The divorce became final in June 1998.

In 1998, Davis started dating Iranian-American craniofacial plastic surgeon Reza Jarrahy, and allegedly married him on September 1, 2001. They have three children: a daughter, Alizeh (born April 2002), and fraternal twin sons, Kaiis and Kian (born May 2004). In May 2018, Jarrahy filed for divorce from Davis, listing their date of separation as November 15, 2017. Davis responded by filing a petition in which she claimed that she and Jarrahy were never legally married. Their divorce became final in December 2021. They agreed to change the last names of their two sons from "Davis-Jarrahy" to "Jarrahy".

Activism

Davis is a supporter of the Women's Sports Foundation and an advocate for Title IX, an Act of Congress focusing on equality in sports opportunities, now expanded to prohibit gender discrimination in American educational institutions.

In 2004, while watching children's television programs and videos with her daughter, Davis noticed an imbalance in the ratio of male to female characters. She went on to sponsor the largest-ever research project on gender in children's entertainment (resulting in four discrete studies, including one on children's television) at the Annenberg School for Communication at the University of Southern California. The study, directed by Stacy Smith, showed that there were nearly three male characters to every female one in the nearly 400 G, PG, PG-13, and R-rated movies analyzed. In 2005, Davis teamed up with the non-profit group Dads and Daughters to launch a venture dedicated to balancing the number of male and female characters in children's television and movie programming.

Davis launched the Geena Davis Institute on Gender in Media in 2007, which works collaborativeli with the entertainment industry to increase the presence of female characters in media aimed at children, and to reduce inequality in Hollywood and the stereotyping of females by the male-dominated industry. For her work in this field she received an honorary Doctor of Fine Arts degree from Bates College in May 2009; and an honorary Oscar, the Academy's Jean Hersholt Humanitarian Award, in 2019.

In 2011, Davis became one of a handful of celebrities attached to USAID and Ad Council's FWD campaign, an awareness initiative tied to that year's East Africa drought. She joined Uma Thurman, Chanel Iman and Josh Hartnett in television and internet ads to "forward the facts" about the crisis.

Athletics
In July 1999, Davis was one of 300 women who vied for a semifinals berth in the U.S. Olympic archery team to participate in the Sydney 2000 Summer Olympics. She placed 24th and did not qualify for the team, but participated as a wild-card entry in the Sydney International Golden Arrow competition. In August 1999, she stated that she was not an athlete growing up and that she entered archery in 1997, two years before her tryouts.

Filmography

Film

Television

Music videos

Awards and nominations

Notes

References

External links

 
 Geena Davis 1988 interview about The Accidental Tourist from Texas Archive of the Moving Image
 
 
 Geena Davis Institute on Gender in Media
 
 
 
 Geena Davis  Video produced by Makers: Women Who Make America

1956 births
Living people
20th-century American actresses
21st-century American actresses
Actresses from Massachusetts
American female archers
American feminists
American film actresses
American television actresses
American voice actresses
American women film producers
Best Drama Actress Golden Globe (television) winners
Best Supporting Actress Academy Award winners
Boston University College of Fine Arts alumni
David di Donatello winners
Female models from Massachusetts
Feminist artists
Film producers from Massachusetts
Jean Hersholt Humanitarian Award winners
Mensans
New England College alumni
People from Wareham, Massachusetts
21st-century American memoirists
American women memoirists